Chay is a masculine name.  It is either a diminutive of Charles, ultimately derived from Germanic Karal, Karel, Karl, meaning “man”, or it may be Gaelic in origin, meaning “Fairy Tale” .  This unusual name surfaced into the public in Britain in the mid-1970s, with the publicity for yachtsman Chay Blyth. It is generally pronounced Sh (as in Shane) ay (as in May), and sometimes pronounced Ch (as in Charles) ay (as in May).

Also an ancient word derived from the Old Testament meaning "And Yahweh will give you a son".

See also

Chal (name)
Char (name)
Charles
Chaise
Chay Blyth
Shay (disambiguation)
Chesster Chay

References

Given names
English given names